4332 Milton, provisional designation , is a background asteroid from the central regions of the asteroid belt, approximately  in diameter. It was discovered on 5 September 1983, by American astronomer Carolyn Shoemaker at the Palomar Observatory in California. The Xe-subtype has a rotation period of 3.3 hours. It was named after Daniel Milton, American geologist with the USGS.

Orbit and classification 

Milton is a non-family asteroid from the main belt's background population. It orbits the Sun in the central asteroid belt at a distance of 1.8–3.4 AU once every 4 years and 2 months (1,518 days; semi-major axis of 2.58 AU). Its orbit has an eccentricity of 0.32 and an inclination of 19° with respect to the ecliptic.

The body's observation arc begins with its official discovery observation at Palomar in September 1983.

Physical characteristics 

In the SMASS classification, Milton is a Xe-subtype that transitions between the X-type and E-type asteroids. It has also been characterized as a carbonaceous C-type by Pan-STARRS large-scale survey.

Rotation period 

In September 2008, a rotational lightcurve of Milton was obtained from photometric observations by Julian Oey at the Kingsgrove  and Leura  observatories. Lightcurve analysis gave a rotation period of 3.2978 hours with a brightness variation of 0.30 magnitude. In August 2012, a refined period of 3.295 hours and an amplitude of 0.16 magnitude was measured by Afşar Kabaş at the Çanakkale University Observatory in Turkey.

Diameter and albedo 

According to the surveys carried out by the Infrared Astronomical Satellite IRAS and the NEOWISE mission of NASA's Wide-field Infrared Survey Explorer, Milton measures between 11.500 and 11.54 kilometers in diameter and its surface has an albedo between 0.1002 and 0.2306.

The Collaborative Asteroid Lightcurve Link derives an albedo of 0.1158 and a diameter of 11.26 kilometers based on an absolute magnitude of 12.7.

Only one brief stellar occultation by 4332 Milton has been observed to date, in 2021.

Naming 

This minor planet was named after Daniel J. Milton (born 1934), American geologist with the United States Geological Survey, known for his geological studies of the Moon and Mars, as well as for research on impact craters and features in Australia. The official naming citation was published by the Minor Planet Center on 30 January 1991.

References

External links 
 Asteroid Lightcurve Database (LCDB), query form (info )
 Dictionary of Minor Planet Names, Google books
 Asteroids and comets rotation curves, CdR – Observatoire de Genève, Raoul Behrend
 Discovery Circumstances: Numbered Minor Planets (1)-(5000) – Minor Planet Center
 
 

004332
Discoveries by Carolyn S. Shoemaker
Named minor planets
004332
19830905